William Peter Barry (30 June 1899 – 21 December 1972) was a Member of the Victorian Legislative Assembly for the Electoral district of Carlton from July 1932 until April 1955. Barry was a member of the Labor Party until March 1955, when he was expelled from the party as part of the  Australian Labor Party split of 1955. He became, with Les Coleman in the Victorian Legislative Council, joint leader of the Australian Labor Party (Anti-Communist), a party that in 1957 became the Democratic Labor Party.

Barry was educated at St Brigid's School, North Fitzroy, Victoria and at St George's School, Carlton. He was a tobacco worker and union official before entering Parliament, and was considered close to John Wren, the Victorian entrepreneur.

Political career
The Communist Party opposed Barry at parliamentary elections in the 1940s with some of its leading members, including Ralph Gibson and Dr Gerald O'Dea. Barry was Minister for Transport in the first Cain government in 1943, Minister for Health, for Housing, and for Forests in the second Cain government from 1945 to 1947, and Minister for Health in the third Cain government from 1952 to 1955. He was also a member of the Melbourne City Council from 1938 to 1955.

Barry was expelled from the Labor Party in 1955 and became leader of the Victorian Labor Party (Anti-Communist). He led his group across the floor to support a successful motion of no confidence in John Cain's government. For that perceived act of political treachery, he had thirty pieces of silver thrown at his feet. Noel Counihan's 1955 painting On Parliament Steps, now in the Art Gallery of Ballarat, depicts the incident. Barry was defeated at the election of 1955 by the ALP candidate Denis (Dinny) Lovegrove. As a Democratic Labor Party candidate, Barry unsuccessfully contested the seats of Fitzroy at the 1961 state election, and Greensborough at the 1967 state election.

Peter Kavanagh
Barry's grandson, Peter Kavanagh, was elected to the Victorian Legislative Council for Western Victoria Region at the 2006 state election, representing the Democratic Labor Party, but was defeated at the 2010 state election. Kavanagh was the first DLP candidate to be elected to the Victorian Parliament since 1955, when Frank Scully won the Electoral district of Richmond.

References

1899 births
1972 deaths
Members of the Victorian Legislative Assembly
Australian Labor Party members of the Parliament of Victoria
Democratic Labor Party (historical) politicians
Politicians from Melbourne
Australian Labor Party (Anti-Communist) members of the Parliament of Victoria
20th-century Australian politicians
People from Northcote, Victoria